In mathematics, the blancmange curve is a self-affine curve constructible by midpoint subdivision. It is also known as the  Takagi curve, after Teiji Takagi who described it in 1901, or as the Takagi–Landsberg curve, a generalization of the curve named after Takagi and Georg Landsberg. The name blancmange comes from its resemblance to a Blancmange pudding. It is a special case of the more general de Rham curve; see also fractal curve.

Definition 
The blancmange function is defined on the unit interval by

 

that is,  is the distance from x to the nearest integer.

The Takagi–Landsberg curve is a slight generalization, given by

 

for a parameter ; thus the blancmange curve is the case . The value  is known as the Hurst parameter.

The function can be extended to all of the real line: applying the definition given above shows that the function repeats on each unit interval.

The function could also be defined by the series in the section Fourier series expansion.

Functional equation definition 
The periodic version of the Takagi curve can also be defined as the unique bounded solution  to the functional equation

 .

 
Indeed, the blancmange function  is certainly bounded, and solves the functional equation, since 
.
Conversely, if  is a bounded solution of the functional equation, iterating the equality one has for any  N
 , for  

whence . Incidentally, the above functional equations possesses infinitely many continuous, non-bounded solutions, e.g.

Graphical construction 
The blancmange curve can be visually built up out of triangle wave functions if the infinite sum is approximated by finite sums of the first few terms. In the illustrations below, progressively finer triangle functions (shown in red) are added to the curve at each stage.

Properties

Convergence and continuity
The infinite sum defining  converges absolutely for all : since  for all , we have:

  if .

Therefore, the Takagi curve of parameter  is defined on the unit interval (or ) if .

The Takagi function of parameter  is continuous. Indeed, the functions  defined by the partial sums  are continuous and converge uniformly toward , since:

  for all x when .

This value can be made as small as we want by selecting a big enough value of n. Therefore, by the uniform limit theorem,  is continuous if |w|<1.

Subadditivity
Since the absolute value is a subadditive function so is the function , and its dilations ; since positive linear combinations and point-wise limits of subadditive functions are subadditive, the Takagi function is subadditive for any value of the parameter .

The special case of the parabola
For , one obtains the parabola: the construction of the parabola by midpoint subdivision was described by Archimedes.

Differentiability

For values of the parameter  the Takagi function   is differentiable  in classical sense at any  which is not a dyadic rational. Precisely, 
by derivation under the sign of series, for any non dyadic rational  one finds

Moreover, for these values of  the function   is Lipschitz of constant . In particular for the special value  one finds, for any non dyadic rational  , according with the mentioned  

For  the blancmange function  it is of bounded variation  on no non-empty open set; it is not even locally Lipschitz, but it is  quasi-Lipschitz, indeed, it admits the function   as a modulus of continuity  .

Fourier series expansion 
The Takagi-Landsberg function admits an absolutely convergent Fourier series expansion: 
 

where  is the maximum power of  that divides .

By absolute convergence, one can reorder the corresponding double series for :

putting  yields the above Fourier series for

Self similarity 
The recursive definition allows the monoid of self-symmetries of the curve to be given. This monoid is given by two generators, g and r, which act on the curve (restricted to the unit interval) as

 
and

 .

A general element of the monoid then has the form  for some integers  This acts on the curve as a linear function:  for some constants a, b and c. Because the action is linear, it can be described in terms of a vector space, with the vector space basis:

In this representation, the action of g and r are given by

and

That is, the action of a general element  maps the blancmange curve on the unit interval [0,1] to a sub-interval  for some integers m, n, p. The mapping is given exactly by  where the values of a, b and c can be obtained directly by multiplying out the above matrices. That is:

Note that  is immediate.

The monoid generated by g and r is sometimes called the dyadic monoid; it is a sub-monoid of the modular group.  When discussing the modular group, the more common notation for g and r is T and S, but that notation conflicts with the symbols used here.

The above three-dimensional representation is just one of many representations it can have; it shows that the blancmange curve is one possible realization of the action.  That is, there are representations for  any dimension, not just 3; some of these give the de Rham curves.

Integrating the Blancmange curve
The computation is recursive with computing time on the order of log of the accuracy required. Defining

one has that

The definite integral is given by:

A more general expression can be obtained by defining

which, combined with the series representation, gives

Note that

This integral is also self-similar on the unit interval, under an action of the dyadic monoid described in the section Self similarity. Here, the representation is 4-dimensional, having the basis .  Re-writing the above to make the action of g more clear: on the unit interval, one has

.

From this, one can then immediately read off the generators of the four-dimensional representation:

and

Repeated integrals transform under a 5,6,... dimensional representation.

Relation to simplicial complexes 
Let
 

Define the Kruskal–Katona function

The Kruskal–Katona theorem states that this is the minimum number of (t − 1)-simplexes that are faces of a set of N t-simplexes.

As t and N approach infinity,
 (suitably normalized) approaches the blancmange curve.

See also
 Cantor function (also known as the Devil's staircase)
 Minkowski's question mark function
 Weierstrass function
 Dyadic transformation

References 
 
 
 Benoit Mandelbrot, "Fractal Landscapes without creases and with rivers", appearing in The Science of Fractal Images, ed. Heinz-Otto Peitgen, Dietmar Saupe; Springer-Verlag (1988) pp 243–260.
 Linas Vepstas, Symmetries of Period-Doubling Maps, (2004)
 Donald Knuth, The Art of Computer Programming, volume 4a. Combinatorial algorithms, part 1. . See pages 372–375.

Further reading

External links
 Takagi Explorer
 (Some properties of the Takagi function)

De Rham curves
Theory of continuous functions